Greatest Hits is the first compilation disc by Richard Marx sold through Avon.  This album contains every single released from Marx's first three discs, including an extra track, "Calling You", which was purported to be the fifth single from the album Rush Street before it was decided against it.

Track listing
All songs written by Richard Marx, except where noted.

 "Take This Heart" (Richard Marx) - 4:10
 "Hazard" - 5:17
 "Chains Around My Heart" (Marx/Fee Waybill) - 5:42
 "Calling You" (Marx/Bruce Gaitsch) - 4:42
 "Children of the Night" - 4:44
 "Hold On to the Nights" - 5:07
 "Don't Mean Nothing" (Marx/Gaitsch) - 4:38
 "Endless Summer Nights" - 4:27
 "Keep Coming Back" - 6:51
 "Satisfied" - 4:14
 "Angelia" - 5:17
 "Right Here Waiting" - 4:24
 "Too Late to Say Goodbye" (Marx/Waybill) - 4:52
 "Should've Known Better" - 4:07

Certifications

1993 greatest hits albums
Albums produced by Richard Marx
Richard Marx albums